Sengphachan Bounthisanh (born 1 June 1987 in bVientiane) is a Laotian footballer playing for Bolikhamxay in Lao League 1.

References

External links 
 Profile
 

1987 births
Living people
People from Vientiane
Laotian footballers
Laos international footballers
Association football goalkeepers